Polski Fiat 508/518, also known as PZInż 302 was a Polish military truck and light artillery tractor. Designed and built by the Państwowe Zakłady Inżynieryjne works (hence the PZInż 302 name), it combine a large number of parts of both Polski Fiat 508 all-terrain vehicle and Polski Fiat 518 car. It was produced in a variety of versions, from light truck and pick-up truck, through radio vehicle to tractor for Bofors 37 mm

Artillery tractors
World War II vehicles of Poland
Military vehicles of the interwar period
Military vehicles introduced in the 1930s